Eagle is a village in Waukesha County, Wisconsin, United States. At the 2020 census, the population was 2,071. The village is located within the Town of Eagle.

History
The town's name comes from an 1836 incident when pioneer Thomas Sugden and two companions, exploring the area, spotted what was described as "a monster bald-headed eagle... hovering and curving over a large mound" in the midst of the prairie.

The village was struck by an EF2 tornado on the night of June 21, 2010. Tornado alert sirens in the area failed to sound prior to the strike. There were no fatalities, but there were several minor injuries. At least 2 homes were leveled to the ground by the tornado and several other homes had major damage.

Geography
Eagle is located at  (42.877595, -88.471918).

Demographics

2010 census
As of the census of 2010, there were 1,950 people, 684 households, and 536 families living in the village. The racial makeup of the village was 98.3% White, 0.1% African American, 0.1% Native American, 0.4% Asian, 1.0% from other races, and 0.2% from two or more races. Hispanic or Latino of any race were 2.1% of the population.

There were 684 households, of which 45.2% had children under the age of 18 living with them, 68.0% were married couples living together, 6.1% had a female householder with no husband present, 4.2% had a male householder with no wife present, and 21.6% were non-families. 18.1% of all households were made up of individuals, and 5.9% had someone living alone who was 65 years of age or older. The average household size was 2.85 and the average family size was 3.25.

The median age in the village was 35.3 years. 30.4% of residents were under the age of 18; 5.8% were between the ages of 18 and 24; 31.3% were from 25 to 44; 24.8% were from 45 to 64; and 7.6% were 65 years of age or older. The gender makeup of the village was 50.8% male and 49.2% female.

2000 census
As of the census of 2000, there were 1,707 people, 592 households, and 468 families living in the village. The population density was 1,346.5 people per square mile (519.0/km2). There were 605 housing units at an average density of 477.2 per square mile (183.9/km2). The racial makeup of the village was 96.49% White, 0.23% Black or African American, 0.53% Native American, 0.29% Asian, 1.35% from other races, and 1.11% from two or more races. 3.05% of the population were Hispanic or Latino of any race.

There were 592 households, out of which 46.5% had children under the age of 30 living with them, 71.3% were married couples living together, 4.6% had a female householder with no husband present, and 20.8% were non-families. 17.1% of all households were made up of individuals, and 6.8% had someone living alone who was 65 years of age or older. The average household size was 2.88 and the average family size was 3.28.

In the village, the population was spread out, with 31.6% under the age of 18, 6.2% from 18 to 24, 38.0% from 25 to 44, 17.6% from 45 to 64, and 6.6% who were 65 years of age or older. The median age was 33 years. For every 100 females, there were 98.7 males. For every 100 females age 18 and over, there were 97.1 males.

The median income for a household in the village was $58,207, and the median income for a family was $62,500. Males had a median income of $41,711 versus $27,500 for females. The per capita income for the village was $21,975. About 1.4% of families and 3.1% of the population were below the poverty line, including 4.3% of those under age 18 and 2.8% of those age 65 or over.

Education

Eagle is part of the Palmyra-Eagle Area School District. The schools serving Eagle include Eagle Elementary School, Palmyra-Eagle Middle/High School. On July 1, 2019, the school board of the Palmyra-Eagle School District voted to dissolve the district. The district cited a lack of funding necessary to continue operations past the 2019–2020 school year. Whether the district will be allowed to dissolve will be determined by the School District Boundary Appeal Board by January 15, 2020.

Images

References

External links

Village of Eagle
Sanborn fire insurance maps: 1894 1900

Villages in Wisconsin
Villages in Waukesha County, Wisconsin